Diario Mali is a collaboration album between Italian composer Ludovico Einaudi on piano and Malian musician Ballaké Sissoko on kora. It was released in Europe in 2003.

Track listings

References

2003 classical albums
Ludovico Einaudi albums